The Laver Cup is an international indoor hard court men's team tennis tournament between Team Europe and Team World, the latter of which is composed of players from all other continents except Europe. Usually held annually since 2017, the tournament is intended to be the Ryder Cup of the tennis world. It normally takes place two weeks after the US Open, with the location rotating between various host cities (that usually do not have an ATP Tour event); alternating yearly between European cities and cities in the rest of the world. In addition to the guaranteed participation fees which are based upon the players' ATP rankings, each member of the winning team gets $250,000 in prize money, but the tournament itself does not count towards the players' point totals in the ATP Tour for that year. In May 2019, the Laver Cup became an officially sanctioned ATP Tour event.Matches during the Laver Cup tournament differ from conventional 3-set matches played on the ATP Tour; in the event when the match is tied at one set all, a 10-point “match tiebreak” is played instead of a deciding final set (this is to ensure that all matches conclude within a reasonable timeframe of approximately 2 hours, whilst enabling 4 matches to be completed within a match day – that begins either at 1 pm local time for Days 1 & 2, or at 12 noon local time for the final Day 3 of the tournament). In addition, unlike conventional ATP tour matches, coaching of match participants is commonly applied courtside by teammates and team captains.

Format
The competition pits six top European players against six of their counterparts from the rest of the world. Each team is led by a team captain, who is a tennis legend.  Three of the six players qualify based on their ATP singles ranking as of the Monday following the French Open in June. Three are "captain's picks", announced by the start of the US Open, in August.

There are 12 matches played over three days (nine singles and three doubles). Each match victory on day 1 is worth one point, on day 2 two points, and on day 3 three points. The first team to claim 13 points wins the tournament. Therefore, the winning team can only be decided on day 3.

No player plays singles more than twice. At least four of the six team members take part in doubles. All matches start as two sets, a 10-point “match tiebreak” is played if the match is level at one set all.

In the event both teams are tied at 12 points each, a fifth match known as “The Decider” is played on day 3, whereby one set is played as a regular set with ad scoring and a tiebreak.

In the event that only one match is required on Sunday (last previous occurrence was at the 2021 Laver Cup), an exhibition match is played following the trophy ceremony.

Tournament schedule

History 

The tournament is named after Australian Rod Laver, a tennis player widely regarded as one of the greatest in the history of the sport (He won all four major titles in the same calendar year, winning the Grand Slam twice in singles, in 1962 and 1969; the latter remains the only time a man has done so in the Open Era.) Roger Federer's management company, TEAM8, Brazilian businessman and former Davis Cup player Jorge Paulo Lemann, and Tennis Australia partnered to create the Laver Cup. Roger Federer was inspired to create a tennis team tournament based on the biennial Ryder Cup golf tournament, which features the best golfers from the United States playing against the best golfers from Europe. However, Laver Cup differs as it is purely an invitational event based on past historical performances; selection of (and the playing agreement with) the tournament participants are not automatically based from the highest ranked players of the recent ATP Tour world rankings.

Former rivals Björn Borg of Sweden (Team Europe) and John McEnroe of the United States (Team World) were announced to serve as captains for at least the first three editions. After the 2019 edition, they announced that they will reprise their roles as team captains for a fourth straight edition.

2017: Inaugural edition 

The first edition was held in Prague from 22 to 24 September 2017, at the O2 Arena. Team Europe defeated Team World 15–9.

2018 

The second edition was held in Chicago from 21 to 23 September 2018, at the United Center. Team Europe defeated Team World 13–8.

2019 

The third edition was held in Geneva from 20 to 22 September 2019, at the Palexpo. Team Europe defeated Team World 13−11.

2021 

The fourth edition was held in Boston from 24 to 26 September 2021, at the TD Garden. It was originally scheduled for September 2020, but was postponed because of the COVID-19 pandemic to avoid overlapping with the 2020 French Open, which was also rescheduled. Team Europe defeated Team World 14−1.

2022 

The fifth edition was held in London from 23 to 25 September 2022, at the O2 Arena.

This tournament marked the retirement of Roger Federer. Team World defeated Team Europe for the first time by a margin of 13−8.

2023 

The sixth edition will be held in Vancouver from 22 to 24 September 2023, at the Rogers Arena.

Records and statistics

Tournament editions

Team statistics

Players

Records

Statistics

Participating nations

See also 

 Davis Cup
 Billie Jean King Cup
 ATP Cup
 Hopman Cup

References

External links 

 Official website

 
ATP Tour
Men's tennis tournaments
Hard court tennis tournaments
Recurring sporting events established in 2017
Indoor tennis tournaments